Blackwood Creek may refer to:

Blackwood Creek (California), a tributary of Lake Tahoe along the Sierra Crest
Blackwood Creek, Tasmania, a community in the Division of Lyons